Antarctica: Empire of the Penguin is a theme area at SeaWorld Orlando which featured a motion-based, trackless dark ride and a penguinarium. The ride has been closed indefinitely since March 2020. The Antarctica-themed area is spread across  inside SeaWorld Orlando. 

Announced in 2011, Antarctica: Empire of the Penguin opened on May 24, 2013. At the time it was the largest attraction at any SeaWorld Entertainment theme park. As part of a campaign to promote the attraction, SeaWorld released a promotional video in July 2012. The area was generally well received by critics and the public at its opening.

History

Rumors and announcement
In August and September 2011, SeaWorld Entertainment filed trademarks for "Antarctica" to be used for a theme area, and "Empire of the Penguins" to be used for an amusement ride. This led to rumors that SeaWorld Orlando would replace its "Penguin Encounter" exhibit (which opened in 1987) with a dark ride. A report by the Orlando Sentinel in October 2011 confirmed these plans, citing "government filings and interviews with people familiar with various elements". At the time, SeaWorld Orlando would not publicly reveal its plans.

On November 8, 2011, SeaWorld announced a multi-year expansion plan featuring the opening of Turtle Trek in 2012 and "Antarctica: Empire of the Penguin" in 2013. Although details of the ride were not released, creative director Brian Morrow said that it would be the coldest attraction in the world and would follow the journey of a tiny penguin. On April 24, 2012, the park revealed further details about the attraction: guests would ride in eight-person vehicles, choosing among two levels of intensity ("Mild" or "Wild"). The surrounding area would also feature a new penguin habitat, restaurant and store.

Construction
The Penguin Encounter, Friends of the Wild and Antarctic Market Restaurant closed on January 3, 2012. They were demolished during the first half of 2012, with vertical construction beginning in July. Construction continued into 2013, with construction walls coming down one week before the attraction's opening. The attraction cost over $40 million.

Opening
On February 19, 2013, SeaWorld Orlando announced that "Antarctica: Empire of the Penguin" would open on May 24. Unlike many attractions, the ride had no soft opening period; instead, it was open to a select number of employees and their families, travel media and bloggers before its public opening.

On May 24, 2013, SeaWorld Orlando opened the attraction to the public. The opening drew thousands of guests to the ride, with some waiting more than four hours to board.

Ride experience and exhibit

Guests enter the queue from the Antarctica-themed area of the park. Large groups of riders and non-riders are admitted into a pre-show room, where projections of an Antarctic landscape are blended with 3D exhibits. In a narrated video, guests are introduced to a gentoo penguin colony in Antarctica featuring a newborn penguin named Puck. After the pre-show guests follow a path to a junction. Non-riders watch another pre-show before entering the penguin exhibit. Riders choose a "mild" or "wild" ride. They are then divided into groups of eight to board a ride vehicle at one of four stations. Riders are seated in two rows of four, and restrained by seat belts.

The vehicle travels around an indoor Antarctic environment, spinning to view a variety of scenery and projection screens. The story which began in the pre-show continues, with Puck venturing out into the sea. When he is underwater, Puck is chased by a leopard seal before resurfacing on land. The ride's theme song – "Antarctica: One World, One Family" by Lauren Alaina – is then played as guests watch a live penguin habitat behind glass before the vehicle returns to a four-platform unloading station.

This exhibit has minimal barriers between guests and inhabitants, and is designed so guests can hear sounds made by the penguins. A total of 245 penguins and alcids live in the exhibit; species include gentoo, king, Adélie and rockhopper penguins, as well as their Arctic counterparts, the puffins, and the murres. The park can change the lighting to control the penguins' seasons. A  glass window allows guests to see them in their  pool from an underwater viewing area. The entire experience takes about 25 minutes.

Theme area
The Antarctica-themed area is spread across  inside SeaWorld Orlando. A  entrance archway is adjacent to the Sea Lion & Otter Theater, and a smaller entrance is near the Journey to Atlantis ride. In addition to the Empire of the Penguin, the theme area is home to several other attractions. A looping 45-minute soundtrack is played throughout the  area. A "South Pole" is in the center of the area, and penguin carvings decorate the surrounding walls. The Expedition Cafe, South Pole Beverages and Glacial Collections sell food, drinks and souvenirs.

Production

Ride system

Antarctica: Empire of the Penguin features a prototype, motion-based, trackless dark-ride system by Oceaneering International, producer of ride systems for The Amazing Adventures of Spider-Man, Transformers: The Ride, and The Curse of DarKastle. The ride is the first of its kind in the world.

When the attraction was announced in November 2011, Oceaneering had already developed a working prototype of the ride vehicle. The first concept art for the attraction was released in April 2012: a circular ride vehicle, seating eight riders in two rows of four. On May 11, 2012, Oceaneering filed a patent application for the ride's technology. At the November 2012 IAAPA Attractions Expo, SeaWorld Orlando and Oceaneering International revealed the trackless, motion simulator-based ride vehicle to the public.

Each battery-powered vehicle, or AGV, is made up of two platforms. Riders sit on the upper platform, which provides three degrees of freedom. A lower platform provides omnidirectional lateral movement. Unlike previous ride designs, the trackless system and the wheel and motor configurations allow movements diagonal to a rider's perspective. The vehicle uses a dead reckoning system developed by Frog AGV to navigate, and can cross another's path. The vehicle's on-board controller communicates wirelessly with a central ride-system controller. Movement commands are issued by the ride-system controller, and executed by the vehicle's controller. A specially-designed system allows the vehicle battery to be quickly charged while docked at the loading and unloading platforms.

Marketing
SeaWorld Orlando announced Antarctica: Empire of the Penguin as part of the park's largest expansion thus far. With 18 months between its announcement and its opening, the park wished to generate demand for the ride. As part of this campaign, SeaWorld released a promotional video in July 2012 and a series of videos (Behind the Freeze) featuring creative director Brian Morrow.

Reception
Dewayne Bevil of the Orlando Sentinel said that "the hottest attraction in Central Florida theme parks this week is also the coldest." Bevil interviewed several park guests; comments included "I thought it [the ride] was really cool" and "it's beautiful", and some described it as better than the attractions it replaced. Barbara Nefer of Examiner.com said that guests would love Puck, the ride's central character. She preferred the wild version of the ride, describing it as "actually still very family friendly" and saying that the exhibit was a "huge highlight" of the attraction. Robert Niles of Theme Park Insider agreed that the highlight of the attraction was the penguin exhibit. Niles described the dispatch procedure as crucial to the ride: "if SeaWorld can dispatch a quartet of ride vehicles every minute or so, as designed, fans will find this a fun ride". In a later article Niles highlighted some guests' criticisms of the ride, describing it as "lacking an engaging story and not delivering enough on-ride views of the attraction's stars — SeaWorld's penguins". However, he argues that SeaWorld's promotions were too photorealistic creating "expectations for an experience that the ride did not deliver, perhaps setting up many of those visitors for disappointment".

Lawrence Goldsmith of the Daily Mirror shared the sentiment of other reviewers: the penguins are the stars of the show. Goldsmith said that the ride options (mild or wild) allowed everyone, from children to thrill-seekers, to "enjoy the experience equally". Arthur Levine of About.com gave the ride three out of five stars, saying he felt conflicted: the animations themselves were good, but the overall storyline was sparse; the ride system was intriguing, yet it was underutilised. He concluded by applauding "SeaWorld for taking the bold initiative to build a major-league attraction", but stated "the ride feels rushed and too short".

From a commercial perspective, the opening day of the area saw guests waiting in line for more than four hours to experience the flagship attraction; SeaWorld had estimated queues of approximately half that time. Dennis Speigel of consulting firm International Theme Park Services expected attendance to increase between five and ten percent. Speigel speculated that this rise would be higher than if a single attraction were unveiled; however, it would be less than the 36-percent increase for Islands of Adventure  after the opening of The Wizarding World of Harry Potter.

In November 2013, Oceaneering won a Thea Award from the Themed Entertainment Association for outstanding themed entertainment and experience design, for the trackless ride system.

See also
 2013 in amusement parks

References

External links

 
 
 Official playlist of videos on YouTube

Amusement rides introduced in 2013
Amusement rides manufactured by Oceaneering International
Dark rides
SeaWorld Orlando
Simulator rides
2013 establishments in Florida